is a Japanese actress and voice actress employed by Atomic Monkey. She is the daughter of the voice actress Keiko Han.

Career
In 2008, after a general public call for the movie Sakura no Sono, she made her debut as Satoshi Wada while studying at the Department of Drama at Nihon University College of Art.

In 2011, she made her debut as a voice actress in the role of Airu Suzaki in Digimon Xros Wars: The Young Hunters Who Leapt Through Time. Then she voiced the main character Gon Freecss in Hunter × Hunter. In the audition, she was unanimously chosen from over 100 participants.

In 2014, she voiced Hime Shirayuki / Cure Princess in the TV anime HappinessCharge PreCure! Among her co-stars is Miki Hase, a classmate from her university.

In 2017, she won Best Actress in a Supporting Role at the 11th Seiyu Awards.

Outside of her voice acting career, she worked at Bandai.

Filmography

Animated television series

Films

Original net animations

Original video animations

Video games

Live action series
Shuriken Sentai Ninninger (2015) (Kyuemon Izayoi (voice))
Shuriken Sentai Ninninger Vs. Kamen Rider Drive Spring Vacation Combining Special (2015) (Kyuemon Izayoi (voice))
Shuriken Sentai Ninninger the Movie: The Dinosaur Lord's Splendid Ninja Scroll! (2015) (Kyuemon Izayoi (voice))
Shuriken Sentai Ninninger vs. ToQger the Movie: Ninja in Wonderland (2016) (Kyuemon Izayoi (voice))
Come Back! Shuriken Sentai Ninninger: Ninnin Girls vs. Boys FINAL WARS (2016) (Luna Kokonoe/MidoNinger/Kyuemon Izayoi (voice))
Ultraman Geed (2017) (Alien Pegassa Pega)
Ultraman New Generation Chronicle (2019) (Alien Pegassa Pega)
Ultraman Z (2020) (Alien Pegassa Pega)
Ultra Galaxy Fight: The Absolute Conspiracy (2020) (sora/Ultraman Justice)
Ultraman Chronicle D (2022) (Alien Pegassa Pega)

Live action film
 Anime Supremacy! (2022), Takaya (voice)

Dubbing roles

Live-action
Chloë Grace Moretz
Let Me In (Abby)
Carrie (Carrie White)
The Equalizer (Alina / Teri)
Dark Places (young Diondra Wertzner)
The Adventurer: The Curse of the Midas Box (Sacha (Mella Carron))
Before Mars (Hana Seung / Joon Seung (Nekhebet Juch / Uatchet Juch))
Crash Landing on You (Seo Dan (Seo Ji-hye))
Death on the Nile (Louise Bourget (Rose Leslie))
Doom Patrol (Jane (Diane Guerrero))
Famous in Love (Cassandra "Cassie" Perkins (Georgie Flores))
The First Lady (Susan Ford (Dakota Fanning))
Harry's Law (Jessica Donner (Halle Charlton))
Independence Day: Resurgence (Sam (Joey King))
Last Night in Soho (Eloise "Ellie" Turner (Thomasin McKenzie))
The Last of Us (Ellie (Bella Ramsey))
Legion (Sydney "Syd" Barrett (Rachel Keller))
Lights Out (Rebecca (Teresa Palmer))
Mad Max: Fury Road (Cheedo the Fragile (Courtney Eaton))
Martin (2018 Blu-ray edition) (Christina (Christine Forrest))
Maze Runner: The Death Cure (Brenda (Rosa Salazar))
Morgan (Morgan (Anya Taylor-Joy))
The Neon Demon (Jesse (Elle Fanning))
The Poseidon Adventure (2016 BS-TBS edition) (Susan Shelby (Pamela Sue Martin))
The Secret Circle (Cassie Blake (Britt Robertson))
The Space Between Us (Tulsa (Britt Robertson))
Teenage Mutant Ninja Turtles (Taylor (Abby Elliott))
Warm Bodies (Julie Grigio (Teresa Palmer))
Willow (Dove (Ellie Bamber))
Winter's Tale (Willa Penn (Eva Marie Saint))
Young Sheldon (Sheldon Cooper (Iain Armitage))
Zack Snyder's Justice League (Iris West (Kiersey Clemons))

Animation
44 Cats (Lampo)
DC Super Hero Girls (Supergirl)
Epic (Dandelion Girl)
Mr. Peabody & Sherman (Carl)
My Little Pony: Equestria Girls (Cheerilee)
My Little Pony: Equestria Girls – Rainbow Rocks (Sonata Dusk)
My Little Pony: Friendship Is Magic (Cheerilee)
PAW Patrol (Ryder)
PAW Patrol: The Movie (Ryder)
RWBY (Penny Polendina, Velvet Scarlatina)
Stillwater (Michael)
Super WHY! (Whyatt Beanstalk/Super Why)
The Boss Baby: Back in Business (Timothy Leslie "Timmy" Templeton)
The Croods: A New Age (Dawn Betterman)
The Powerpuff Girls (Bliss)
Thunderbirds Are Go (Eiden Williams)

Video Games
The Last of Us (2013), (Ellie (Ashley Johnson))
The Last of Us Part II (2020), (Ellie (Ashley Johnson))

Awards

References

External links
 
 

1989 births
Living people
Japanese child actresses
Japanese people of Taiwanese descent
Japanese video game actresses
Japanese voice actresses
Nihon University alumni
Seiyu Award winners
Voice actresses from Tokyo
21st-century Japanese actresses